Invasion of Corsica may refer to a number of historical events including:

 Invasion of Corsica (1553)
 French Conquest of Corsica
 British Intervention in Corsica (1794)